"Say My Name" is a song by the American girl group Destiny's Child.

Say My Name may also refer to:

Music
 "Say My Name", a 2019 song by ATEEZ from their EP Treasure EP.2: Zero to One
 "Say My Name", a 2014 song by Austin Mahone
 "Say My Name", a song from the stage musical Beetlejuice
 "Say My Name" (David Guetta, Bebe Rexha and J Balvin song), 2018
 "Say My Name", a 2018 song by Digital Farm Animals featuring Iman
 "Spectrum (Say My Name)", a re-released single by Florence + the Machine
 "Say My Name", a 2017 song by JBJ from their album Fantasy
 "Say My Name" (Peking Duk song), 2015
 "Say My Name" (Tove Styrke song), 2017
 "Say My Name", a 2017 song by Lil Yachty from his album Teenage Emotions
 "Say My Name", a 2014 single by Odesza featuring Zyra from the album In Return
 "Say My Name", a 2010 song by Porter Robinson
 "Say My Name", a 2005 song by Within Temptation from their album Angels
 Say My Name EP, a 2011 EP by Faydee and the EP's title track
 Say My Name (EP), a 2020 EP by Hyolyn
 "Say My Name", a 2022 song by The Lathums

Other uses
 "Say My Name" (Breaking Bad), an episode of the television series Breaking Bad
 Say My Name! (Musical), Breaking Bad musical named for the episode of the same name
 Say My Name (film), a 2018 film starring Lisa Brenner and Nick Blood
 Say My Name, a novel by Allegra Huston